The Wanderers Football Club, nicknamed, Eagles, is an Australian rules football club, currently playing in the Northern Territory Football League (NTFL).

The club was formed in 1916 as a founding member of the NTFL. It has produced Australian Football League (AFL) players such as Shannon, Daniel and Marlon Motlop, Russell Jeffrey, Mark West, Troy Taylor, Relton Roberts, Steven Motlop and Liam Patrick.

Club achievements

Club song

External links

Wanderers FC - Facebook
Full Points Footy Profile for Wanderers Football Club

Sport in Darwin, Northern Territory
Australian rules football clubs in the Northern Territory
1916 establishments in Australia
Australian rules football clubs established in 1916